Wolfdietrich Traugott (born 12 May 1939) is an Austrian rower. He competed in the men's coxed four event at the 1960 Summer Olympics.

References

1939 births
Living people
Austrian male rowers
Olympic rowers of Austria
Rowers at the 1960 Summer Olympics
Rowers from Linz